Bidorpitia columna is a species of moth of the family Tortricidae. It is found in Loja Province, Ecuador.

The wingspan is about 14 mm for males and 27 mm for females. The ground colour of the forewings is pale ferruginous to the middle and dark brownish ferruginous in the posterior are, with refractive suffusions and rust-brown strigulation (fine streaks). The markings are brown with a rust admixture. The hindwings are cream tinged with orange in the terminal third.

Etymology
The species name refers to shape of the uncus and is derived from Latin columna (meaning column).

References

Moths described in 2008
Euliini
Moths of South America
Taxa named by Józef Razowski